Khani Ab (also Romanized as Khānī Āb) is a village in Jaydasht Rural District, in the Central District of Firuzabad County, Fars Province, Iran. At the 2006 census, its population was 37, in 14 families.

References 

Populated places in Firuzabad County